Marko Terrell Mitchell (born March 11, 1985) is a former American football wide receiver. He was drafted by the Washington Redskins in the seventh round of the 2009 NFL Draft. He played college football for the Nevada Wolf Pack.

Mitchell was also a member of the Detroit Lions and Minnesota Vikings.

Early years
Mitchell was born on March 11, 1985, in Port Huron, Michigan, to mother Geneva Mitchell. He attended Sumter County High School in York, Alabama, where he was a standout basketball player. He began playing football during his junior year. Alabama recruiters showed interest in Mitchell, but he did not score high enough on the SAT.

College career
He initially attended Itawamba Community College in Fulton, Mississippi, but did not play on the football team. Mitchell said the school promised him an athletic scholarship, but gave it to someone else. The following year, he transferred to Mesa Community College in Mesa, Arizona, where he played football. He recorded 34 receptions for 719 yards and eight touchdowns for an average of 21.1 yards per catch.

He transferred to the University of Nevada, Reno, and played on the football team starting in the 2006 season. That year, he saw action in all 13 games including seven starts. Against Northwestern, he recorded a season-high of six catches. He compiled two receptions for 72 yards against Utah State. He also scored against Arizona State, Idaho, and Louisiana Tech. In the 2006 MPC Computers Bowl against Miami, Mitchell recorded the Wolf Pack's only touchdown with one reception for 27 yards.

In 2007, he recorded 53 receptions for 1,129 yards and eight touchdowns, and led the team in each category. His 21.3 yards per catch ranked the second-highest average in the nation after Brennan Marion of Tulsa. Mitchell's 86.8 receiving yards per game ranked the sixth-best in the Western Athletic Conference (WAC) and 23rd in the nation. He also ranked tenth in the WAC with 4.08 receptions per game. Against San Jose State, he recorded 144 yards and a career-first two touchdowns. He also recorded at least 100 receiving yards against Fresno State, Boise State, New Mexico State.

Going into the 2008 season, he was named a Phil Steele's preseason first-team All-WAC, Athlon Sports preseason second-team All-WAC, and Lindy's preseason second-team All-WAC. Mitchell saw action in all 13 games and compiled 61 receptions for 1,141 yards and ten touchdowns. He recorded 100-yard games against Texas Tech, Idaho, Utah State, Louisiana Tech, and against Maryland in the 2008 Humanitarian Bowl. After the season, he was named to the All-WAC first-team.

Professional career

Washington Redskins
Mitchell was selected in the seventh round of the 2009 NFL Draft (243rd overall) by the Washington Redskins. At the 2009 NFL Combine, he ran the 40-yard dash in 4.49 seconds, and his size and speed had impressed the Redskins staff. He was expected to compete with 12-year NFL veteran James Thrash for the fifth wide receiver position on the Washington roster, but Thrash was released in June after failing a physical. On June 13, the Washington Redskins signed Marko Mitchell to a 4-year, $1.793 million contract.

On May 3, 2010, Mitchell was waived by the Redskins.

Detroit Lions
Mitchell was claimed off waivers by the Detroit Lions on May 5, 2010. He was waived on June 25.

Minnesota Vikings
Mitchell was claimed off waivers by the Minnesota Vikings on June 28, 2010. After playing in three pre-season exhibition games Mitchell was waived by the Vikings on August 31, 2010.

Edmonton Eskimos
The Edmonton Eskimos of the Canadian Football League signed Mitchell  on September 7, 2010. He was later released.

Calgary Stampeeders
On June 3, 2011, the Calgary Stampeders signed Mitchell to an undisclosed contract. He was waived during final cuts before the start of the 2011 CFL season.

References

External links
Washington Redskins bio

1985 births
Living people
American football wide receivers
Detroit Lions players
Edmonton Elks players
Minnesota Vikings players
Nevada Wolf Pack football players
Players of American football from Michigan
Players of American football from Alabama
People from Port Huron, Michigan
People from Sumter County, Alabama
Sportspeople from Metro Detroit
Washington Redskins players